This is a list of the Lebanon national football team results from 1990 to 1999.

Following the Lebanese Civil War, Lebanon's first qualifying tournament was the 1994 World Cup qualification, where they failed to qualify finishing third in their group. They also failed to qualify to the 1996 Asian Cup and the 1998 World Cup. Lebanon participated in the 1997 Pan Arab Games, where they finished third, the 1998 Arab Cup, the 1998 Asian Games and the 1999 Pan Arab Games.

Results

1993

1995

1996

1997

1998

1999

Notes

External links
Lebanon fixtures on FIFA.com
Lebanon fixtures on eloratings.net
Lebanon fixtures on RSSSF.com
Lebanon 1993–1999 fixtures on RSSSF.com
International matches on RSSSF.com

1990s in Lebanese sport
1990-99